Kristina Rihanoff (: Kristina Pshenichnykh; born 22 September 1977) is a world finalist professional ballroom dancer, instructor, choreographer and author.
She has a degree in Tourism and Hospitality; after finishing public school she studied with St Petersburg Branch of Modern Humanitarian Academy which has several colleges around Russia including Vladivostok.

Early life
The daughter of two engineers, Rihanoff was born and grew up in Vladivostok, Russia, and started taking dance lessons from aged 5. Her parents divorced when she was aged 12, during the time when the breakup of the Soviet Union was occurring. Living with her mother, aged 15 she became a part-time dance instructor to help the household budget, earning in a day what her professionally educated mother could earn in a month.

Dance career
Aged 21, she was asked to become an instructor to Russian dancers based in the United States. She also undertook displays and instructed on dance classes in the evenings. She developed her career over the next few years through a combination of teaching and performing, in the United States as well as choreographing shows in China, Hong Kong and Japan.

Continuing her professional dance career, she gained 1st place in the South African International Latin Championship (2005–2006), 2nd in the US National American Rhythm Finals (2003–2005), 2nd in the Open to the World, Mambo Championship (2003–2004), and was a semi-finalist at the Open to the World, Blackpool Dance Festival in 2007.

After being partnered with American professional Brian Fortuna, she has performed in the UK with Robin Windsor since 2011.

Strictly Come Dancing

Highest and lowest scoring performances per dance

Rihanoff competed as a professional dancer in the sixth series of Strictly Come Dancing in 2008. She was partnered up with political broadcaster and author John Sergeant. On 19 November 2008, Sergeant announced that he would be withdrawing from the series, leaving them in seventh place.

Rihanoff returned in 2009 to compete for the show's seventh series, in which she was partnered with professional boxer Joe Calzaghe. The couple were eliminated on week five of the competition, landing in eleventh place. Rihanoff and Calzaghe subsequently began a relationship, which lasted until 2013.

Rihanoff returned to compete for the show's eighth series in 2010, in which she was partnered with musician and DJ Goldie. The couple were eliminated on week two from the competition, landing in fourteenth place. Later in the year, she took part in and won the show's Christmas Special, partnering actor John Barrowman. On 15 June 2011, Rihanoff was announced as one of the professional dancers for the show's ninth series. She was partnered with Australian actor and singer Jason Donovan. The couple reached the final of the competition, and finished in third place.

Rihanoff returned to compete in the show's tenth series, partnering actor Colin Salmon. The couple were eliminated on the fifth week of the competition, landing in eleventh place. In 2013 (series 11), she was partnered with former England rugby player Ben Cohen. The couple were eliminated in the ninth week of the competition, finishing in eighth place.

In 2014, Rihanoff returned to compete in the show's twelfth series. She was partnered with Blue singer Simon Webbe. The couple reached the final of the competition, and finished as one of the runners-up. In 2015, she competed in the show's thirteenth series, partnering with Irish singer Daniel O'Donnell. They became the third couple to be eliminated from the competition, leaving in thirteenth place.

Performances and results

With celebrity partner John Sergeant

With celebrity partner Joe Calzaghe

 

With celebrity partner Goldie

With celebrity partner Jason Donovan

1 Jennifer Grey temporarily replaced Goodman as a judge for week 6.

With celebrity partner Colin Salmon

With celebrity partner Ben Cohen

With celebrity partner Simon Webbe

1 Donny Osmond appeared as a guest judge for week 3.

With celebrity partner Daniel O'Donnell

Live tours and stage productions

Rihanoff has been taken part in the Strictly Come Dancing Live Tour from 2009 to 2015. In 2009 she performed with fellow professional dancer, Matthew Cutler and filled in for Lilia Kopylova at one show, partnering Julian Clary.On the Strictly 2010 tour, Rihanoff was partnered with Series 4 Champion Mark Ramprakash. They danced the Salsa and the Argentine Tango. On the Strictly 2011 tour, Rihanoff was partnered with actor Jimi Mistry, they danced the Foxtrot and Paso Doble. In 2012, 2014 and 2015 Rihanoff reunited with her dance partners from the television series, Jason Donovan, Ben Cohen and Simon Webbe, respectively. Rhianoff and Webbe went on to win the overall tour in 2015.

In 2012 Rihanoff and Robin Windsor joined fellow professional Artem Chigvintsev and former Strictly contestant Kara Tointon for the first 'Dance to the Music Tour'.

Other projects

In Summer 2015, Rihanoff and Windsor took part in the Touring Theatre Production of Puttin' On The Ritz, as well as Dance Weekends around the county.

Rihanoff choreographs a number of professional and commercial dance works. These have included both Burn the Floor and Dancing on Wheels, which she choreographed with Fortuna. She has also choreographed dance routines inside the television commercials, including those for St Tropez suntan lotion, Panache bras and MeMeMe Cosmetics.

Rihanoff has written a book entitled The Art of Dancesport Makeup for newcomers to Ballroom dance competition, a subject that she studied extensively in Russia. Rihanoff participated in the 2008 Weakest Links Strictly Come Dancing special.
Rihanoff's weekly column in Best Magazine during each Strictly season has proved hugely popular. Rihanoff regularly appears in the mainstream media including Hello Magazine, Heat Magazine, OK, Best Magazine, Let's Talk etc.

Rihanoff has appeared in the Celebrity Version of Mastermind, with her specialist subject which was Patrick Swayze.
Rihanoff has also appeared on The Hairy Bikers Programme, cooking the Traditional Russian Dish Borscht.
Choreographing a couple of UK TV Adverts Including the BT Commercial and also Aviva Insurance.

In 2017, Rihanoff directed and choreographed 39-day tour Dance To The Music. The tour featured Rihanoff and Robin Windsor, Oksana and Jonathan Platero, and six more professional world-class dancers. In September 2017 Rihanoff launched her fashion line in collaboration with Pia Michi.

Rihanoff appeared as a guest in Netflix's Baby Ballroom in both seasons.

Celebrity Big Brother
On 5 January 2016, Rihanoff became a housemate in the 17th series of Celebrity Big Brother. On Day 3 she announced, in the house, she and boyfriend Ben Cohen were expecting a child, and that was roughly three months into her pregnancy. The pair were dance partners on the 2013 series of Strictly Come Dancing and at the time Cohen was still married to his former wife Abby. On 19 January 2016, Rihanoff became the third housemate to be evicted from the house, having received the fewest votes to save, spending a total of fifteen days in the house.

Personal life

Rihanoff is a patron of children's charity called The Dot Com Foundation helping children deal with risky situations, whether it be violence within the home, to confidence building.

Following her well-publicised relationship with Joe Calzaghe, it was revealed in 2015 that another of her former partners, Ben Cohen, had left his wife Abby for Rihanoff, and in 2016 the couple had a daughter, Milena. In November 2022, Cohen and Rihanoff got engaged in the Maldives.

In 2017, it was reported that Rihanoff and Cohen had adopted a vegan diet to overcome health issues.

References

External links
 
 Academy Ballroom International – Kristina Rihanoff (2009 archived copy)
 Dancesport Info listing for Kristina Rihanoff (Pchenitchnykh)

1977 births
Living people
21st-century American dancers
21st-century Russian dancers
American ballroom dancers
People from Vladivostok
Russian ballroom dancers
Russian emigrants to the United States
Russian expatriates in England
Russian female dancers